Ancistrotropis  is a genus of flowering plants in the legume family, Fabaceae. It belongs to the subfamily Faboideae. Species in this genus were formerly considered to belong to the genus Vigna.

References

Phaseoleae
Fabaceae genera